Navia phelpsiae is a plant species in the genus Navia. The species is endemic to Venezuela.

References

phelpsiae
Flora of Venezuela